Windows Opened is an album by flautist Herbie Mann recorded in 1968 and released on the Atlantic label.

Reception

The Allmusic site awarded the album 4 stars stating "Recorded with Herbie Mann's working band at the time, Windows Opened captures the quintet tackling a mixed set of contemporary jazz and pop tunes. ...Although this is not one of the essential recordings in Mann's catalog, it features excellent playing throughout, with an amazing collection of talent".

Track listing 
 "There Is a Mountain" (Donovan Leitch) - 6:08
 "If I Were a Carpenter" (Tim Hardin) - 5:41
 "Paper Man" (Charles Tolliver) - 6:47
 "Footprints" (Wayne Shorter) - 8:27
 "By the Time I Get to Phoenix" (Jimmy Webb) - 2:22
 "Windows Opened" (Roy Ayers) - 7:30
Recorded in New York City on February 8, 1968 (tracks 1 & 3-5) and April 2, 1968 (tracks 2 & 3)

Personnel 
Herbie Mann - flute
Roy Ayers - vibraphone
Sonny Sharrock - guitar
Miroslav Vitouš - bass
Bruno Carr - drums
Technical
Adrian Barber - engineer
Talât Sait Halman - poetry consultant
Stanislaw Zagorski - sculpture and album design
Chuck Stewart - photography

References 

Herbie Mann albums
1968 albums
Albums produced by Joel Dorn
Albums produced by Arif Mardin
Atlantic Records albums